was a  after Kōji and before Kyūan. This period spanned the year from February 1144 through July 1145.

Change of Era
 February 6, 1144 : The new era name was created to mark an event or series of events. The previous era ended and a new one commenced on March 27, 1144 (Kōji 3, on the 22nd day of the 2nd month).

Events of the Ten'yō Era
 1144 (Ten'yō 1, 7th month): A new era name was created because a comet was sighted in the sky in the 7th month of  Ten'yō gannen.
 1145 (Ten'yō 1, 8th month): The empress Taiken-mon In, mother of former-Emperor Sutoku died.
 1145 (Ten'yō 1): The emperor went to Iwashimizu Shrine and to the Kamo Shrines.

Notes

References
 Brown, Delmer M. and Ichirō Ishida, eds. (1979).  Gukanshō: The Future and the Past. Berkeley: University of California Press. ;  OCLC 251325323
 Nussbaum, Louis-Frédéric and Käthe Roth. (2005).  Japan encyclopedia. Cambridge: Harvard University Press. ;  OCLC 58053128
 Titsingh, Isaac. (1834). Nihon Odai Ichiran; ou,  Annales des empereurs du Japon.  Paris: Royal Asiatic Society, Oriental Translation Fund of Great Britain and Ireland. OCLC 5850691
 Varley, H. Paul. (1980). A Chronicle of Gods and Sovereigns: Jinnō Shōtōki of Kitabatake Chikafusa. New York: Columbia University Press. ;  OCLC 6042764

External links 
 National Diet Library, "The Japanese Calendar" -- historical overview plus illustrative images from library's collection

Japanese eras